A vidiprinter is a sports scores and results ticker service provided to media organisations. A vidiprinter providing football results is used on BBC One and Sky Sports News when significant games are in progress.

Since its inception, the vidiprinter service was supplied by the Press Association, the UK's national and international news and sport agency. From the 2013–14 season, the contract was taken over by Opta Sports.

Implementation 

The BBC, Sky Sports and BT Sport show a vidiprinter during their scores and results programmes. Their vidiprinters appear at the start of the 3pm kick-offs until 5pm when all the results are in although Sky Sports keeps the vidiprinter onscreen whilst the channel broadcasts its classified check and whilst presenter Jeff Stelling goes through the updated league tables.

The vidiprinter is also seen when a lot of midweek games are being played. Since 1998 Sky Sports has broadcast a midweek version of Soccer Saturday, Soccer Special, and the vidiprinter is on screen from 7:45pm until around 9:45pm (later on English Cup nights). The BBC also shows a midweek edition of its scores service called Midweek Final Score although the programme is a text and graphics service with audio coming from BBC Radio 5 Live. Both channels produce editions of their scores programmes on Boxing Day, New Year's Day and Easter Monday as a full set of English games (plus Scottish games on Boxing Day) take place on those three bank holiday afternoons. 

Neither broadcaster produces a football scores service on Sundays even though all of the top Premier League clashes now happen on Sundays, as well as other Premier League, Championship, FA Cup and Scottish games and the entire women’s football programme. The only exception has been the final day of the Premier League season due to the final set of fixtures being played on a Sunday although since the BBC regained the rights for the FA Cup in 2014–15, a Sunday edition has been broadcast on the weekends of the first and second rounds of the competition with the vidiprinter seen on-screen when the FA Cup games are in progress. However in late 2020, Sky Sports News' Sports Sunday programme, which airs between 12noon and 6pm and focusses on all of the day's sport as well as the afternoon's football, began displaying the vidiprinter throughout the programme. 

BBC Scotland broadcasts its own Saturday afternoon results programme, Sportscene Results, and the vidiprinter is onscreen from the start of the programme until the start of the classified results at 5pm.

There are also various versions of the vidiprinter on the internet. As well as English and Scottish football, The Sporting Life's website vidiprinter features league, but not Cup, scores and results from the top global leagues. The Sky Sports online vidiprinter largely mirrors the vidiprinter seen on Sky Sports News and the Football Web Pages vidiprinter includes scores, results and scorers from steps 2, 3 and 4 of the non league pyramid and expanded its coverage at the start of the 2019/20 season to include the women's game, the Welsh Premier League and nine European competitions. This is the only vidiprinter to include steps 3 and 4 (the Isthmian, Northern Premier and Southern Leagues).

As of mid 2017, the BBC's website no longer features a vidiprinter. The BBC website had included a vidiprinter from the early 2000s. Originally this was a live feed of the Press Association service featuring all the competitions that the service covered. However from the 2007-08 season the BBC started to create its own version by removing competitions that it felt did not merit inclusion and as time progressed the coverage generally mirrored the competitions featured on the BBC's website. In October 2013 it began featuring European league matches at the expense of non league, Welsh and Irish games although the BBC did re-introduce coverage of the regional Conference leagues to their online vidiprinter at the start of the 2014–15 season. Later Welsh Premier League and Northern Ireland Premiership scores reappeared but cup competitions from both countries were not featured. In 2017 the BBC removed the vidiprinter from its website as part of a revamp of its scores section.

History

BBC 

Since the earliest days of Grandstand a live feed of the day's football results as they came in has been a regular fixture on BBC Television on Saturday afternoons during the football season. Initially this came in the form of a live shot of the Teleprinter with the presenter standing next to the printer reading out and interpreting the results as they came in. By the 1980s, a live shot of the printer had been replaced by an on-screen computerised version and was renamed the vidiprinter  but the letter-by-letter typing format continued until the end of the 2000–01 season. The teleprinter/vidiprinter was on-screen for around eight minutes at full-time, from just after 4:40pm until enough of the major results were in to provide the full classified check at around 4:50pm. Late goal flashes were omitted from the feed to ensure that only results were shown once the results started to come in. In January 1999, the BBC started to display the vidiprinter at the bottom of the screen during the half-time scores sequence although generally only during the first part of this sequence, i.e. just when the Premier League reports were shown. From this time, the late goal flashes started to appear in the full-time vidiprinter section of Final Score, which was now generally onscreen for more than ten minutes, from around 4:45pm until 5pm because by now half time intervals at Premier League and Football League matches had been extended from 10 to 15 minutes.

At the start of the 2001-02 season, Final Score became a programme in its own right and the on-screen format for the vidiprinter changed. The biggest change was the replacement of the typing format with a much faster ticker-tape style and over the next two seasons, the vidiprinter was on screen for the entire half time round-up and also on the bottom of the screen during the final few minutes of Grandstand prior to the start of Final Score. In August 2003, the BBC started broadcasting the vidiprinter continually from 15 minutes before kick-off until the major full times were in. However, this service is only available on the Red Button until Final Score started on BBC One, which by 2003 was starting at the earlier time of 4:30pm. In the 2003–04 season, this was merely an on-screen service and Grandstand played in a quarter-screen. Called Score Interactive, it was available from around 2:45pm until Final Score started when this feed took the main Final Score programme. During this first Red Button season, the vidiprinter feed often fed through team news as it became available to the Press Association for the period prior to kick-off. The following season, BBC Sport decided to broadcast a full scores programme in its own right. Called Score, it ran between 2:30pm and 6pm with the 4:30pm to 5:15pm segment simulcast on BBC One. However, the vidiprinter did not appear until 3pm and the team news feed was not shown. In around 2008, the entire programme became part of Final Score.

In November 2007 a midweek version of Final Score was launched. This is a simulcast of BBC Radio 5 Live with the vidiprinter shown on-screen and is called Midweek Final Score. This was the first time that the BBC had shown the vidiprinter on midweek evenings. Originally on air throughout the programme, the vidiprinter is now only seen when the evening's games are in progress.

On 26 October 2013, Final Score stopped showing the vidiprinter feed as provided by Opta Sports and decided to create its own edited version. This had been common practice on the internet for many years but this was the first time that a broadcaster chose to do this. The main change was a massive reduction in the number of competitions covered. With the exception of the national and regional Conference leagues, all non-league information was removed as were the scores from all the other minor, reserve and youth league and cup competitions, Also removed was information from the women's game, from Welsh and Northern Irish cup competitions and all information from games in the Republic of Ireland. Other changes saw the replacement of the competition codes with the BBC's own codes, all goal flashes are accompanied by the competition in which the game is taking place and injury time goals show the number of minutes of injury time played at the time the goal is scored. Some club names are given differently from how they are displayed on the raw feed and scores and results sometimes appear in a slightly different order. Prior to this date, Final Score had always shown the vidiprinter feed unedited since the teleprinter was first seen on air during the earliest days of Grandstand.

For the 2016/17 season, goal flashes from the Welsh Premier League were reinstated but the 2017/18 season saw further reductions. The regional National League divisions were removed as was the Irish Premiership and the Welsh Premier League although the Welsh Premier League was reinstated after a few weeks.

Until the start of the 1990s, incoming rugby results would appear alongside football scores. However by the 1990s it became possible to produce a football-only version and incoming rugby results were then no longer seen by viewers, although until 2003 rugby results were still occasionally seen, usually around half a dozen times each season, possibly in error apart from maybe when the result from a significant game had not appeared: in the 1990s the rugby results were generally given immediately prior to the vidiprinter sequence. The last time that any rugby information was seen on the BBC vidiprinter was in November 2003 although on 7 October 2006, Wales on Saturday did broadcast the version of the vidiprinter which included rugby scores and results. However, this was a one-off as the following week the vidiprinter seen on Wales on Saturday was the football-only version.

BBC Scotland 
BBC Scotland has historically shown its own football results programme. From 1989–2001, it was known as Afternoon Sportscene and it opted out of Grandstand at around 4:40pm when the Final Score segment of the programme was about to begin, and consequently the programme included a vidiprinter sequence which lasted for roughly the same time as it did on Final Score. The programme was renamed Sportscene Results at the start of the 2001-02 season although it wasn't until the end of the decade that the vidiprinter was on-screen from the start of the programme until the classified results at 5pm.

As with Final Score, the vidiprinter seen on BBC Scotland historically took the raw feed but in November 2013, two weeks after Final Score launched an edited version, BBC Scotland followed suit. All English non-League scores, as well as all Welsh and Irish scores, were removed. BBC Scotland also started using its own codes, prefixing all English games with the letter 'E'. However in 2017 some of this information was restored. Scores and results from the National League (including the North and South divisions), Welsh Premier League and the Northern Ireland Premiership along with goal flashes and sendings-off from all of those leagues was re-instated. This is the first time that a vidiprinter on television has shown the scorers and sendings-off from the National League North, National League South and the Northern Ireland Premiership - this information had been available on the BBC's online vidiprinter since the 2014/15 season.

BBC Wales 
During the final few years of Grandstand, BBC Wales also opted out of the final few minutes of Final Score to provide a round-up of the Welsh football and rugby results and in 2001 launched its own separate results programme called Wales on Saturday until it was dropped in 2008. The vidiprinter was on-screen from the start of the programme until 5pm.

BBC Northern Ireland 
As with BBC Scotland, BBC Northern Ireland has always produced its own results programme. However it does not start broadcasting until 5pm. Consequently, the Northern Ireland programme does not feature an on-screen vidiprinter.

Sky Sports 
Sky Sports launched a sports magazine programme, Sports Saturday, in August 1992 and the vidiprinter was on-screen during the results section of the programme, which was called Scorelines. The vidiprinter appeared at around 4:30pm, more than ten minutes before the vidiprinter appeared on Grandstand. In August 1998, Sports Saturday was morphed into Soccer Saturday and dropped the actual sports coverage in favour of a continuous service of scores, comments, reports and results. From this point the vidiprinter was on-screen from 3pm until 4:55pm although the vidiprinter disappeared between 3:50pm and 4pm for the duration of the classified half time round-up. In the 2004–05 season the decision was taken to keep the vidiprinter on-screen during the half time round-up and also during the full-time classified check and whilst presenter Jeff Stelling went through the updated league tables. This meant that the vidiprinter was now on-screen continuously from 3pm until the first commercial break after the end of the day’s games, at just after 5:10pm.

On 12 August 2014, Sky Sports launched Sky Sports News HQ and at this point decided to stop showing the raw feed as from this date and competitions where only half time/full time scores were provided stopped being shown. Consequently information about all Welsh, Irish and women's football, all non-league football in both England and Scotland, apart from the Conference Premier, and all reserve and youth football is no longer seen by viewers. Also at this time, Sky Sports started using its own competition codes. Sky Sports was the last media organisation to stop providing viewers with the raw feed and did so after 22 years of showing a largely unedited version: the broadcaster had in recent years sometimes used its own competition codes, shortened the way team names were given and had never shown timings of sendings-off. Women's football  information was re-introduced in 2021.

In late 2020, Sky Sports News started to show the vidiprinter throughout its Sunday afternoon programme Sports Sunday. The feed is different to what is used on Saturdays as it also includes the main five European leagues. 

The vidiprinter seen on Sky Sports has always exclusively focused on football although until 2009 the Sky Sports website did feature vidiprinters on the rugby union and rugby league sections of the Score Centre section of their website. Live scores were featured for the Rugby Union Premiership, the Anglo-Welsh League, the Pro 12, the Heineken Cup and all international matches. Full-time scores for the RFU Championship, National Leagues 1 and 2 were featured along with results from the Welsh National League Premier Division and Divisions 1 East and 1 West, the top three national leagues in Scotland and the All-Ireland League. Now, only the football section of the vidiprinter service is available and, as with the Sportinglife.com vidiprinter, does not feature non-league scores apart from the National League Premier Division whereas prior to 2009 the Sky Sports Football vidiprinter did include non-league scores as well as Welsh and Irish football.

BT Sport 

At the start of the 2016-17 football season BT Sport launched a Saturday afternoon scores service - BT Sport Score. The programme shows a vidiprinter from 3pm until the end of the programme at 5pm. Prior to the 2016-17 season BT Sport had not broadcast a scores programme and therefore had not shown an on-screen vidiprinter. The information on BT's vidiprinter was similar to that seen on Sky Sports - ie no non-league apart from the National League but in 2018 BT became the first television broadcaster to include European league scores and results on its on-screen vidiprinter, something that has been commonplace on internet vidiprinters for many years. BT Sport is also the only TV channel whose vidiprinter provides information on the FA Women's Super League.

Other broadcasters 

ITV never broadcast a teleprinter/vidiprinter during the days of World of Sport or its replacement results programme Results Service.  However, when ITV2 launched in December 1998, a football scores programme was broadcast, called Football First, which in August 2001 was renamed The Goal Rush to coincide with ITV capturing the highlights package for the FA Premier League. The programme was simulcast on ITV from around 4:30pm. A live scores ticker featured as part of this service although it was never referred to as the vidiprinter. The ticker only featured the top leagues in England and Scotland. Non-league football below the Football Conference and football in Wales and Northern Ireland did not feature on ITV's scores programme.

The short-lived Setanta Sports News broadcast a vidiprinter on Saturday afternoons although some minor results, and for some reason, the Northern Ireland league results, were omitted. As opposed to the BBC and Sky Sports, the vidiprinter on Setanta Sports News would remain on-screen long after 5pm, sometimes until well into the evening for the duration of the teatime kick-offs.

From 2010 until 2014 S4C broadcast a game from the Welsh Premier League every Saturday afternoon and showed the vidiprinter, translated into Welsh. It was displayed on the bottom of the screen during the actual match as well as during the build-up and at half time. The vidiprinter was edited to include only the matches in Wales and the major games in England. Scottish games and English non league matches are removed from S4C's vidiprinter service.

ESPN UK did not broadcast a live scores programme and therefore did not show an on-screen vidiprinter.

Sky News use a vidiprinter as part of their election coverage to display recent declarations from constituencies, with the results being coloured in the colour of the winning party. It usually comes on screen following the first declaration in the election and remains on screen until the end of the election programme.

References 

Sports television in the United Kingdom
Telegraphy